Gidon Graetz  (born 1929, Tel Aviv) is a Swiss-Israeli sculptor. He studied in the mid-1950s at Accademia delle Belle Arti in Firenze and at Les Beaux-Arts in Paris.

His public art sculptures are found widespread in cities such as Zürich, Detroit, New York City, Los Angeles, Brisbane, Chicago and Berlin, and has exhibited work in Europe, Australia and the United States.

Settled in a castle in Fiesole overlooking Firenze in Tuscany, Graetz is married to Sunniva Rasmussen, and among their four children is the Tuscan winemaker Bibi Graetz.

See also
List of public art in Brisbane

References

External links

 Gidon Graetz official site

1929 births
Living people
People from Tel Aviv
Swiss sculptors
Israeli sculptors